James Jon Berry-McNally (born 10 December 2000) is an English professional footballer who plays as a winger or forward for Macclesfield.

Career
Born in Wigan, Berry signed scholarship forms with his hometown club Wigan Athletic in December 2016 after being released by Liverpool. In November 2017, he was an unused substitute in a 4–0 defeat against Accrington Stanley in the EFL Trophy, but made no first team appearances for the club.

In November 2019, Berry joined Hull City after the club agreed a compensation deal with Wigan. On 11 February 2020, he made his senior debut as a substitute in a 3–0 defeat against Blackburn Rovers.

After his release from Hull, he joined Macclesfield on loan after signing for Altrincham. He signed a two-year contract to make his move to Macclesfield permanent in March 2022, becoming the club's record signing. He scored 18 goals in his 34 appearances during the 2021-22 season, including a brace in a 4-0 win against Ashton Athletic which secured the North West Counties Premier Division title on 12 March 2022.

Career Statistics 
As of match played 4 February 2023

References

External links
 
 

2000 births
Living people
English footballers
Association football midfielders
Footballers from Wigan
Hull City A.F.C. players
English Football League players
Macclesfield F.C. players
Wigan Athletic F.C. players
Altrincham F.C. players
North West Counties Football League players